The British Rail Class 303 electric multiple units, also known as "Blue Train" units, were introduced in 1960 for the electrification of the North Clyde and the Cathcart Circle lines in Strathclyde. They were initially classified as AM3 units before the introduction of the TOPS classification system, and were the dominant EMU on the Glasgow suburban railway network for over 25 years before being progressively phased out by newer rolling stock. The final units were withdrawn from service in 2002. The fleet's lifespan was 42 years.

The units were later used on the Inverclyde and Argyle lines of the Glasgow suburban railway network as various electrification schemes came to fruition.

Description
Ninety-one 3-car units were built by Pressed Steel at Linwood near Paisley, from 1959–1961, and they were introduced into service in 1960. A further 19 near-identical Class 311 units were built in 1967 following the Inverclyde electrification, although these units were built by Cravens in Sheffield.

When new, the units were initially numbered in the range 001-091, but were later renumbered to 303 001-091 when TOPS was introduced. Each unit consisted of 3-cars coupled together in a semi-permanent formation, and up to four sets could be operated in multiple to form up to a 12-car formation. Although 6-car formations were frequently operated, 9-car formations were operated occasionally. 12-car formations were usually only seen as a result of train failures or ECS workings to the depots at Shields Road or Hyndland. The two outer carriages of each unit were driving trailers, with an intermediate motor coach containing the motor bogies and electrical equipment. Units operated from the standard 25 kV alternating current (AC) overhead power lines system, with power collection via a Stone Faiveley AMBR pantograph on the motor coach. The technical description of the formation is DTSO+MBSO+BDTSO. Individual vehicle numbers are shown below.
 75566-75600 and 75746-75801 - DTSO
 61481-61515 and 61812-61867 - MBSO
 75601-75635 and 75802-75857 - BDTSO
The class was built in two batches; units 303001-035 were built 1959-60 (nominally for the North Clyde Line) and units 303036-091 were built 1960-61 (nominally for the Cathcart Circle Lines). In practice, when built, the North Clyde lines required the majority of the units. There was no electrified connection between the two networks until late in the life of the trains, and thus transfers between the two halves of the system, performed quite regularly, were dragged by locomotives via the Shields Road-High Street line. As the Class 303 were air braked, and most diesel locomotives of the early era were vacuum braked, a few Class 20 diesels were fitted with air brake connections for this, although when the Class 303 were new there were still a few former Caledonian Railway 4-4-0 steam locomotives in stock with the Westinghouse air brake, which were used for the transfers, and for delivering the units from their factory in Paisley.

Based on the Mark 1 bodyshell design, the Class 303 units utilised electrical gear made by Metropolitan-Vickers (Metrovick). The Class 303s were originally dual voltage - parts of the North Clyde Line and Cathcart Circle electrification was limited to 6.25 kV (rather than the standard 25 kV arrangement) due to limitations in insulation technology, although this feature was rendered redundant as 25 kV was eventually standardised across the entire line. Following a series of transformer explosions, caused by damage to the transformer windings from backfires in the mercury arc rectifiers, the entire stock of Class 303s had to be hastily withdrawn from service after only a few weeks' service. Over the weekend of 17/18 December 1960 all 72 EMU sets were taken into storage and the old steam-operated service was temporarily reinstated whilst urgent modifications were made. This also delayed the handing over of the Cathcart Circle service to electric operation.

The units had many features which made them state of the art at the time of their introduction. This included the use of pneumatically operated sliding passenger doors (the only Mark 1 based EMU to use this feature), with passenger-operated door opening buttons. In practice, the doors were usually operated by the train guard (later driver, after modification for driver-only operation).

When built, the driving cabs had distinctive wrap-around front windows, although these were replaced by flat, toughened glass in the 1970s to better protect drivers following some incidents of stone-throwing vandalism. Glass partitions behind the cabs allowed passengers in the front and rearmost carriages to see the drivers' view of the track. This was particularly appreciated in the scenic riverside areas around Craigendoran and Helensburgh.

The interiors of the Class 303s were fitted with tungsten light bulbs whilst the Class 311s had fluorescent lighting.

The Class 303 fleet were nicknamed the "Blue Trains" upon their introduction, owing to the striking Caledonian Blue livery. This was later changed to the standard BR Blue, quickly superseded by BR Blue/Grey livery in the late 1960s and early 1970s although the nickname itself persisted through subsequent livery changes right up until the class's withdrawal.

Refurbishment

In 1984, the Provincial ScotRail sector of British Rail began a major refurbishment programme for 50 of the 25-year-old units. To conform to contemporary health and safety standards the asbestos insulation was removed. Among the many changes introduced were connecting doors between coaches and a new type of push button passenger door control, along with all-new interiors and new fluorescent lighting. Most units also received new "hopper-style" windows. The new seating was controversial - it was almost identical to that of the Class 314, albeit with a 2+2 configuration. This allowed for many more standing passengers, but with far fewer seats than previously. The original seating was deep sprung and (arguably) far more comfortable.  In addition, the original heating, which was provided by panelled in heaters beneath the seats, was replaced by heaters in longitudinal trunking along the lower bodyside, with the spaces under the new seats opened up.  This produced draughts and reduced passenger legroom in the window seats.

The glass bulkheads behind the driving cabs were another casualty of the refurbishment - passengers could no longer see the driver's view through the front windows. Following refurbishment, units were repainted in the striking new orange and black livery introduced by the newly created Strathclyde PTE.

Decline

Most of the remaining unrefurbished units were withdrawn at the end of the 1980s, following the introduction of new Class 320 units on the North Clyde route in 1989. In the early 1980s, following a decline in passengers in the Glasgow area, several Class 303s were transferred to north west England. Initially, they were used on the Crewe to Liverpool service but were soon transferred to the Manchester area, operating services from Manchester Piccadilly to Altrincham, Hazel Grove, Macclesfield, Alderley Edge, Crewe and on the line to Glossop and Hadfield - this line had recently been converted from 1500 V DC. The 303s replaced the Class 506s. All but one of these, no. 303048, were withdrawn by the mid-1990s. This unit was transferred north again to Glasgow, and retained in unrefurbished condition for special trains. It was originally intended to preserve this unit, but due to asbestos contamination it was scrapped in 1996.

Following privatisation of British Rail, the surviving 40 units passed to the ScotRail franchise. By now electrification around Glasgow had spread, and units could be found working on many routes, such as those to Gourock, Motherwell, Coatbridge and Ardrossan Town. Four units, nos. 303019/021/023/087 received SPT's new carmine and cream livery.

As part of ScotRail's franchise commitment, new more modern Class 334s were built from 1999-2000 by Alstom to replace the last of the elderly units. After an introduction plagued with teething problems, the Class 334 fleet started to enter service in large numbers on the SPT network in 2001/2002, allowing the Class 303 units to be withdrawn. Following withdrawal, the units were towed to Immingham RFT for scrapping. The last Class 303 passenger train operated on the North Clyde Line on 30 December 2002, formed of units 303011 and 303088, operating the 09:27 Bellgrove to Helensburgh Central. The stock then worked ECS to Yoker Depot where they were withdrawn from service.

Incidents and accidents
The Class 303s were involved in many accidents in their 42 years of service.

Further use
A few vehicles were converted for departmental use, following withdrawal from service.
 BDTSO 75613 from unit 303013 is currently used by the British Transport Police at Gravesend.
 Unit 303049 was converted into a test unit, numbered 303999. It was used by Network SouthEast from 1991 until 1996 based at Ilford then Clacton, and was later scrapped.

Preservation
One complete unit has been saved for preservation. It is a hybrid unit consisting of the driving vehicles from set 303032 and the motor coach from 303023, which replaced 303032's own damaged motor coach. Unit 303023 was one of only four to carry the later SPT carmine/cream livery. The set has been modified to operate in multiple with a blue-star compatible diesel locomotive (typically a Class 27) so that it can be driven on an unelectrified heritage line.

A complete Class 311 unit, which were almost identical to the Class 303s, was preserved at Summerlee, Museum of Scottish Industrial Life in Coatbridge, although one driving trailer has since been scrapped.

References

Notes

Bibliography

 
 Hall, Stanley (1999). Hidden Dangers: Railway Safety in the Era of Privatisation. Shepperton: Ian Allan Publishing. .
 Hall, Stanley (2003). Beyond Hidden Dangers: Railway Safety into the 21st Century. Hersham: Ian Allan Publishing. .

Further reading

External links

 http://www.eastbank.org.uk/303.htm, a web-page dedicated to the Blue Train
 https://web.archive.org/web/20070911193932/http://www.jhowie.force9.co.uk/303tributepage1.htm, another Class 303 tribute page.

303
Transport in Glasgow
Train-related introductions in 1960
25 kV AC multiple units